Plateosauravus ("grandfather of Plateosaurus") is a basal plateosaurian of uncertain affinities from the Late Triassic Elliot Formation of South Africa.

Sidney Haughton named Plateosaurus cullingworthi in 1924 from a partial skeleton, type specimen SAM 3341, 3345, 3347, 3350–51, 3603, 3607. The specific name honoured collector T.L. Cullingworth. Friedrich von Huene reassessed it in 1932 as belonging to a new genus, which he named Plateosauravus. Jacques van Heerden reassigned it to Euskelosaurus in 1979, and this has been how it was usually considered. However, recent study indicates that Euskelosaurus is based on undiagnostic material and thus a nomen dubium; in his series of sauropodomorph and basal sauropod papers, Adam Yates has recommended no longer using Euskelosaurus and has suggested the use of Plateosauravus instead.

More than a dozen additional partial skeletons have been found in the Kruger National Park after a discovery by game warden Adriaan Louw on 27 March 1995. These include juvenile individuals.

References

External links 
 Adam Yates on basal sauropodomorphs

 

Plateosauria
Late Triassic dinosaurs of Africa
Triassic South Africa
Fossils of South Africa
Fossil taxa described in 1932
Taxa named by Friedrich von Huene